The Xikeng Formation is located in Xiushui County, Jiangxi Province, and contains alternating beds of purplish red, grayish green and yellow green sandy and muddy rocks. The Xikeng Formation is dated to the Late Silurian - Early Devonian period.

References 

Geologic formations of China
Devonian System of Asia
Silurian System of Asia